Tony Aquila,  is an American businessman, investor and serial entrepreneur. He is the current CEO and chairman of Canoo Technologies, Inc., founder and former chairman and CEO of Solera Holdings, a technology company that provides risk and asset management software and services to the automotive industry, as well as the property and casualty insurance industry. 

Aquila was also chairman of Sportradar, a provider of sports data intelligence between February 2019 and July 2020.

Prior to founding Solera, Aquila served in executive positions with Mitchell International, Inc., Ensera, Inc. and MaxMeyer."

Early life 
Aquila was born in Richmond, California to an immigrant and military family. After dropping out of high school, Aquila worked at his uncle's body shop sweeping floors and replacing windshields.

Business career

Canoo Technologies, Inc. 

Tony Aquila was an initial investor in Canoo, before becoming a member of the Board. He was named Board Chair in October, 2020, and CEO in March 2021.  Utilizing their Multi-Purpose Platform, they plan to build multiple variants of vehicles such as the Canoo LV (LifeStyle Vehicle), MPDV (Multi Purpose Delivery Vehicle), Canoo Truck, and upcoming Canoo Sports Vehicle. Currently, the LV is planned for production in late 2022. The MPDV, Truck, and Sports Car are planned for 2023 2024 and 2025 respectively.

Solera Holdings, Inc. 
Since founding the company in 2005, Aquila served as the chairman and CEO of Solera Holdings until his departure in May 2019.

Mitchell International, Inc. 
Aquila is the former president and chief operating officer of Mitchell International, Inc., a company that provides claims estimating and communications software to insurance carriers. Aquila joined Mitchell in 2001 after it had acquired Ensera.

Ensera, Inc. 
Aquila was founder and CEO of Ensera, Inc., a claims workflow software company for the vehicle insurance and collision industry.

MaxMeyer America, Inc. 
Prior to Ensera, Aquila was founder and CEO of MaxMeyer America, Inc. (a subsidiary of MaxMeyer Duco, SPA, Italy), an importer and distributor of European automotive refinishing products. In 1997, PPG Industries acquired MaxMeyer Duco, SPA.

Controversies

Solera Global Holding Corp. 
Following the take-private transaction of Solera, Aquila’s leadership failures and misplaced spending priorities, among other things, led to Solera missing its plan objectives. Aquila’s brash, vulgar, and belittling comments to colleagues resulted in significant personnel turnover, including in the executive ranks. A 2018 investigation initiated after a complaint from one of Aquila’s subordinates uncovered aggressive and abusive behavior by Aquila in violation of Solera’s code of conduct, substantiated by Aquila’s own admissions. His behavior had a significant adverse impact on Solera’s ability to retain employees.

Canoo Inc. 
On March 29, 2021, Canoo, an electric vehicle company, announced that it would be changing its business model by deemphasizing its engineering services and subscription-based business. On the same day, Canoo issued a press release stating its fourth quarter and full year 2020 results, and removed language about its "unique business model" from its statement. During a conference call to discuss its financial results, the company's CEO, Tony Aquila, announced that the CFO was being replaced. As a result of this news, shares of Canoo dropped 21.2% the next day. A lawsuit was filed alleging that the company made materially false and/or misleading statements and/or failed to disclose the changes to its business model.

References 

American technology chief executives
Living people
1966 births